Olimpiu is a masculine Romanian given name. Notable people with the name include:

Olimpiu Becheș (born 1955), Romanian rugby union player
Olimpiu Bucur (born 1989), Romanian footballer
Olimpiu Blaj (born 1986), Romanian actor
Olimpiu Marin (born 1969), Romanian sports shooter
Olimpiu Moruțan (born 1999), Romanian footballer
Olimpiu G. Urcan (born 1977), chess historian

Romanian masculine given names